Michael Kennedy  (born 1 February 1949) is a former Irish Fianna Fáil politician.

He served as a member of Fingal County Council from 1991 to 2007, and was Mayor from 2002 to 2003. He was an insurance broker before entering politics.

From 2007 to 2011, he was a Teachta Dála (TD) for the Dublin North constituency. He was an unsuccessful candidate at the 1998 Dublin North by-election and at the 2002 general election but was elected at the 2007 general election. He lost his seat at the 2011 general election, being eliminated on the fourth count.

References

 

1949 births
Living people
Councillors of Dublin County Council
Fianna Fáil TDs
Local councillors in Fingal
Members of the 30th Dáil
Politicians from County Dublin
Politicians from County Wicklow